Jan Lecjaks (born 9 August 1990) is a Czech footballer who plays for Cypriot First Division club Omonia as a left back.

Club career

Viktoria Plzeň 
Lecjaks began his career in 1996 playing for the youth team of Sokol Štěnovice and in 2000 he joined Viktoria Plzeň. In the 2007/2008 season, he made his professional debut for Viktoria Plzeň in the Gambrinus liga on 11 November 2007 against Mladá Boleslav. He won the Czech Cup with Viktoria Plzeň in 2010. 

On 10 June 2010 he went on loan to Anderlecht for a season. While at Anderlecht, on 18 August Lecjaks scored an own goal in a 2–2 away draw in a Champions League play-off round qualifier.

Young Boys 
In July 2011 he signed for Swiss side Young Boys on a four-year contract. In April 2013 he signed a loan contract with Vålerenga out the 2013 season.

Dinamo Zagreb 
On 24 June 2017, Lecjaks joined Croatian club Dinamo Zagreb on a three-year contract. On 19 November, he scored his first goal for the club in a 2–0 victory against Lokomoitva. In August 2018, he was loaned out to Lokomotiva.

Omonia 
On 6 August 2019, Lecjaks joined Cypriot club Omonia on a two-year contract. A year later, he renewed his contract until 2022. 

On 16 September 2020, he scored the decisive penalty in a Champions League qualifier against Red Star Belgrade, which guaranteed Omonia participation in the group stage of a European competition, for the first time in the club's history. On 22 October, he assisted the team's first goal at the group stage level, in a 1-1 away draw against PAOK. Lecjaks played an important role in Omonia winning the 2020–21 Cypriot First Division, finishing the season with 12 assists in the league, playing as a left back.

The 2021-22 season was also successful for Lecjaks, who scored his first four goals for the club and renewed his contract until 2024. He won the 2021 Super Cup and the 2021-22 Cypriot Cup with Omonia, although he missed the final due to injury. He made his 100th appearance for Omonia on 16 February 2022, in a 2-0 away win against Aris Limassol, in the Cypriot First Division.

International career
Lecjaks is former youth international for the Czech Republic. He played for the Czech Republic national under-20 football team at the 2009 FIFA U-20 World Cup in Egypt He is a member of the Czech under-21 team. He represented the team at the 2011 UEFA European Under-21 Football Championship.

Career statistics

Honours

Club
Viktoria Plzeň
Czech Cup: 2009–10

Anderlecht
Belgian Super Cup: 2010

Omonia
Cypriot First Division: 2020–21
Cypriot Cup: 2021–22
Cypriot Super Cup: 2021
Individual
Swiss Super League Team of the Year: 2016–17
Cypriot First Division Team of the Year: 2020–21

References

External links

1990 births
Living people
Czech footballers
Czech Republic youth international footballers
Czech Republic under-21 international footballers
Czech First League players
FC Viktoria Plzeň players
Sportspeople from Plzeň
R.S.C. Anderlecht players
Vålerenga Fotball players
BSC Young Boys players
GNK Dinamo Zagreb players
NK Lokomotiva Zagreb players
Czech expatriate footballers
Czech expatriate sportspeople in Belgium
Czech expatriate sportspeople in Norway
Czech expatriate sportspeople in Switzerland
Expatriate footballers in Belgium
Belgian Pro League players
Swiss Super League players
Eliteserien players
Croatian Football League players
Expatriate footballers in Norway
Expatriate footballers in Switzerland
Expatriate footballers in Croatia
Czech expatriate sportspeople in Croatia
Association football defenders
AC Omonia players